The 2012 UK Music Video Awards were held on 8 November 2012 at the Odeon West End in Leicester Square, London to recognise the best in music videos and music film making from United Kingdom and worldwide. The nominations were announced on 8 October 2012. English rapper M.I.A. won Video of the Year for "Bad Girls" directed by Romain Gavras.

Video of the Year

Special Awards

Video Genre Categories

Technical

Music Vision and Innovation

Individual

References

External links
Official website

UK Music Video Awards
UK Music Video Awards
UK Music Video Awards